Scott Erickson is a baseball player.

Scott Eri(c)kson may also refer to:

Scott Erickson (musician)
Scott Erickson (golfer) in U.S. Junior Amateur Golf Championship
Scott Erikson, fictional character, on List of Saved by the Bell: The New Class episodes